Pete Lee-Wilson is a British television and film actor.

Biography
His first role was in the television show, Metal Mickey. He has also appeared in The Bill, Spooks and was in the 2009 Doctor Who story "The End of Time".

Personal life
His parents were both performers on stage, and his mother also ran a dancing school in Exmouth, Devon.

Filmography

References

Year of birth missing (living people)
Living people
People from Exmouth
English male film actors
English male television actors
Male actors from Devon
Place of birth missing (living people)